The 2003–04 Denver Pioneers men's ice hockey season was the 55th season of play for the program and 45th in the WCHA. The Pioneers represented the University of Denver in the 2003–04 NCAA Division I men's ice hockey season, played their home games at Magness Arena and were coached by George Gwozdecky, in his 10th season. The team won the 2004 NCAA Division I men's ice hockey tournament, the 6th title in program history.

Season
Entering the season, Denver was in a bit of a slump. The Pioneers were seven years removed from their last NCAA tournament win and had made just 1 appearance in the Frozen Four since 1972. While the team was ranked entering the season, Denver was outside the top-10 and not one of the favorites to challenge for the championship. The Pioneers started well, winning their first six games of the year, but they stumbled a bit once they began their conference schedule. Splits against schools like Minnesota and Colorado College didn't harm their standing, however, getting badly beaten twice by North Dakota at home didn't engender much faith from the voters. The Pioneers played up and down though the first half of their season but did settle on a few facts; Adam Berkhoel was their starting goalie and without him they didn't have much of a chance.

As the season progressed, it became apparent that while Denver could score goals, they did not have the high-end offense that some of their contemporaries did. None of the players reached 20 goals on the year and only Gabe Gauthier managed to average a point per game. On the back end, their defense was no juggernaut either; while allowing 27 shots against per game wasn't bad, it was hardly world-beating. Berkhoel was key for the team's chances and while he turned in several sterling performances, the senior netminder would go through bad stretches during the season. Denver also had a slight disadvantage of playing in the WCHA, which was typically regarded as the best conference in college hockey. When they hit the winter break, Denver had a solid record overall but were under .500 in conference play. After resuming their season in January, Denver won 4 games in a row but then followed that up with a 1–4–1 stretch against WCHA teams. With their ranking having dropped to #12, the Pioneers were in danger of missing out on the NCAA Tournament and needed to arrest their slide.

After a week off at the beginning of February, the Pioneers appeared to steady themselves and didn't drop another game for the remainder of the regular season. The team went 7–0–1 over the final four weeks and put themselves into the top-5. With their postseason position essentially guaranteed, Denver began the conference tournament against long-time rival Colorado College at home. After a lackluster loss in the first game, Denver's defense collapsed and allowed 6 goals to the Tigers. The poor performance knocked the Pioneers out and dropped their ranking by several spots. While the team would still make the national tournament, the losses meant that they would have to open against a stronger opponent in the first game.

NCAA Tournament
Denver's final ranking by the selection committee was 8th, good enough for the final 2-seed and a spot in the Western Regional final, located in Colorado Springs. Behind a partisan crowd, the Pioneers took on Miami and got off to a good start. team captain Ryan Caldwell opened the scoring with a short-handed marker in the first and then played a strong defensive game to hold off the RedHawks. The two traded goals in the final two periods but Miami was never able to tie the game and Denver skated away with a narrow victory.

For their second match of the tournament, Denver had to go through the #1 overall seed, North Dakota. The Fighting Sioux had easily taken the season series and were looking to put the Pioneers down with another embarrassing loss but Berkhoel would have none of it. While Denver was outshot 17–33 in the game, not a single one went into the Pioneer cage. Denver's offense was anemic all game and the scoresheet sat empty for over 57 minutes. Just when it appeared that overtime was inevitable, junior Luke Fulghum deflected a shot from Max Bull into the net. North Dakota desperately tried to even the score but the horn sounded before they would score and Denver was off to Boston.

In the national semifinal, things couldn't have started worse for the Pioneers. Minnesota–Duluth scored twice in the first five minutes of the game and, after Denver gave Duluth four additional power play opportunities, it appeared that the Bulldogs were going to roll over the Pioneers. Somehow, Berkhoel and the defense held and prevented UMD's lead from increasing. A more even second period gave Denver the chance they needed and Fulghum cut the lead in half near the mid-point of the game. Unfortunately, a 6th power play opportunity for Minnesota–Duluth saw them regain their 2-goal edge and Denver needed a mammoth effort in the final frame if they wanted their season to continue. The Pioneers came out swinging in the third and Connor James scored in the third minute. Just 34 seconds later, Caldwell added a marker and suddenly Denver was in a tie game. Duluth called a timeout to settle their players down but Denver had all the momentum and they continued to press the attack. Lukas Dora, who had taken the penalty that had led to UMD's third goal, redeemed himself by giving Denver its first lead of the game. The defense then turned in a masterful performance to limit the Bulldog's scoring opportunities and the Pioneers bled the clock for the final 11 minutes. An empty-net goal sealed the deal and put Denver in the championship match for the first time in 35 years.

In the final game of the year, Maine was all that stood between Denver and the program's 6th title. While the Black Bears had a good offense, they had produced one of the top defensive seasons in the history of college hockey. The opposition was led by goaltender Jimmy Howard, who had set numerous NCAA records that season, including save percentage and goals against average. Playing as the underdog, Denver got off to a slow start and allowed Maine to open the scoring on their first power play of the game. The Pioneers were then beneficiaries of a very controversial ruling by the officials when the goal was waved off. Mike Hamilton was ruled to have committed a crease violation by having his skate be inside the protected area before the puck entered the goal crease. While he had not materially contributed to the goal, it was enough of an infraction to wave off the goal, much to the ire of the partisan audience. Seven minutes later, while on a power play of their own, James found Gauthier alone in the slot and the senior center scored the first official goal of the game. Neither team played particularly well on offense for the rest of the contest and it was typified by strong defensive play and penalties. Over the final two periods, the two teams combined for twelve minor penalties and six power play opportunities but just 34 shots. Denver was able to ride its narrow lead for most of the game and as time ticked away they grew closer and closer to the title. With just over 2 minutes left on the clock, Matt Laatsch was called for hooking and sent Maine to the power play for the 6th time that night. On one of the Black Bears' zone entries, Gabe Gauthier snagged the puck out of the air and tossed it back down the ice. The referees ruled that he had closed his hand on the puck and handed him a 2-minute penalty for delay of game. Now Denver found itself having to defend a 3-on-5 disadvantage for the final 90 seconds of the game, a situation made all the more precarious when Maine pulled their goaltender to give them twice as many skaters as the Pioneers. The final stretch of the game would go down in college hockey lore as one of the more stunning defensive efforts but neither the defense nor Berkhoel nor the post would give an inch and Maine failed to score. A missed pass to the point helped Denver run out the clock and win the national championship.

Departures

Recruiting

Roster
As of August 12, 2021.

Standings

Schedule and results

|-
!colspan=12 style="color:white; background:#862633; " | 

|-
!colspan=12 style="color:white; background:#862633; " | Exhibition

|-
!colspan=12 style="color:white; background:#862633; " | Regular Season

|-
!colspan=12 style="color:white; background:#862633; " | 

|-
!colspan=12 style="color:white; background:#862633; " | 

|- align="center" bgcolor="#e0e0e0"
|colspan=11|Denver Lost Series 0-2
|-
!colspan=12 style="color:white; background:#862633; " |

National Championship

(E1) Maine vs. (W2) Denver

Scoring statistics

Goaltending statistics

Rankings

Note: USCHO did not release a poll in weeks 12, 26 and 27.

Awards and honors

Players drafted into the NHL

2004 NHL Entry Draft

† incoming freshman

References

2003-04
Denver Pioneers
Denver Pioneers
Denver Pioneers
Denver Pioneers
NCAA men's ice hockey Frozen Four seasons